The 1997 Big West Conference baseball tournament determined the conference champion for the Big West Conference at the end of the 1997 season. The teams met at Long Beach State's on campus venue, Blair Field from May 15 through 18.

Seeding and format 
The top team from each of the conference's two divisions after the regular season received the top two seeds, while the four teams with the highest conference winning percentage regardless of division were seeded three through six in the double-elimination tournament. Matchups were set to avoid inter-divisional games in the early rounds as much as possible.

Bracket 
The bracket below depicts the results of the tournament.

References 

Tournament
Big West Conference Baseball Championship